Axelson is a surname. Notable people with the surname include:

Jan Axelson (born 1949),  American author and conservationist
Joe Axelson (1927–2008), American sports executive
Matthew Axelson (1976–2005), American Navy SEAL

See also
Axelson (company), 1920s aero engine maker
Axelsen
Axelsson